Carlos Alberto Saldaña Moreno (born 27 October 1996) is a Mexican professional footballer who currently plays for Sacramento Republic in the USL Championship.

Career
Saldaña was born in El Nayar, Nayarit, but moved to the United States just after he was born.

Saldaña played with USSDA club side De Anza Force before he joined the Guadalajara academy, where he played at various levels, including 30 regular season appearances for the club's Guadalajara Premier side until it disbanded in 2019. In 2019, he led Chivas to the reserve league finals, only to fall on aggregate. He also spent time on loan with Liga de Expansión MX side Tepatitlán.

On September 15, 2021, Saldaña  signed with USL Championship side Sacramento Republic for the remainder of the season.

References

External links

1996 births
Living people
American soccer players
American sportspeople of Mexican descent
Association football goalkeepers
C.D. Guadalajara footballers
Sacramento Republic FC players
People from Vallejo, California
Soccer players from California
USL Championship players
Footballers from Nayarit
De Anza Force players
Mexican footballers